Novara Calcio Youth Sector comprised the under-19 team and the academy of Italian professional football club Novara Calcio. The club played in Group C of the Campionato Nazionale Primavera. They played in Group A of the league until the end of the 2015–16 season.

Primavera

Squad

'*' denotes a player with first-team appearances

Non-playing staff

 Manager: Giacomo Gattuso
 Fitness Coach: Stefano Pavon
 Goalkeeping Coach: Renato Redaelli
 Team Doctor: Dario Dameno 
 Team Manager: Dino Lo Curto
 Team Manager: Marco Morganti

Players with dual nationality
  Mouloud Sana
  Andrea Antonielli

Youth system
The training facility(s) of Novara's Youth Sector is based at Novarello Villaggio Azzurro.

Below the Primavera team (U19), there are ten other teams: 
Allievi Nazionali (U17)
Allievi Lega Pro  (U16)
Giovanissimi Nazionali  (U15)
Giovanissimi Regionali  (U14)
Giovanissimi Sperimentali (U13)
Esordienti (U12)
Pulcini Regionali (U11)
Pulcini B (U10)
Pulcini C (U9)
Scuola Calcio (U8)

Moreover, Novara has 53 affiliated clubs around Italy, such as: 
Accademia Calcio Sabaudia
Amor Sportiva
Aquile della Brianza
Don Bosco
Beata Giuliana

References

External links
 Novara Primavera 
 Novarello Villaggio Azzurro 
 The Club - NOVARA | Lega Serie A  
 Novara Calcio: Lega Serie B  

 
Football clubs in Piedmont and Aosta Valley
Football academies in Italy